Route 380 is a  long mostly east–west secondary highway in the northwest portion of New Brunswick, Canada.

The route's North-Eastern terminus is north-east of the community of Limestone. The road travels south-east to the community of Lake Edward.  The road then takes a sharp turn north to the community of New Denmark Corner.  The road again makes a sharp turn this time towards the south-east passing Outlet Brook before entering the community of Bell Grove.  The road then switches direction to the south-west again then enters the community of Merritt Lake.  After this, the road takes its last major directional change south-east passing the community of Anderson Road before ending in Saint Elmo.

History

Intersecting routes
None

See also

References

380
380